Uracil glycol is a major oxidation product of cytosine in DNA. It can be readily bypassed by E. coli DNA polymerase I (unlike thymine glycol) and be a potent premutagenic lesion.

References

Pyrimidinediones
Vicinal diols